Çetinkaya is a village in the Kangal district of the Sivas Province in Turkey. It is located along the Ankara-Kars railway and is near the Çetinkaya junction, where the Çetinkaya-Malatya railway diverges south. As of 2016, Çetinkaya has a population of 1,205. Between 1960 and 2011, the population was in a constant drop from about 4,000 inhabitants in 1960 to 1,477 inhabitants in 2011, a 63% decrease. Due to its population decrease, the town was relegated to a village in the early 2010s.

The village is located just north of the D.260 state highway and Çetinkaya station is serviced by intercity trains from Ankara (temporarily Irmak) to Kars, Kurtalan, and Tatvan, as well as regional trains from Sivas to Divriği.

References

External links
Çetinkaya Belediyesi

Villages in Kangal District